Father's Office is a gastropub located at 1018 Montana Avenue in Santa Monica, California and has become famous for the Office Burger, which Esquire called one of the best burgers in the world.

History
Father's Office was founded in 1953. From 1986 to 2000, under the ownership of Lou Moench, Father's Office was influential in the rise of America's craft brewing industry and the establishment of smoke-free bars in California.

Moench initially sold two types of beers from Anchor Brewing Company and Sierra Nevada Brewing Company, and expanded the beer menu over the years to include more than 70 brands from California, Oregon and Washington. Selections would vary, depending on available stock and season.

Looking back on when he purchased Father's Office in the late '80s, Moench said embracing craft beer came with a cost. "When I stopped selling Bud and put Widmer Hefeweizen on that tap handle, I got a reaction. I had to educate people."

Father's Office made headlines in 1991 when Moench decided to voluntarily make it California's first smoke-free bar. For Moench, taking action was a health issue for his employees. "Secondhand smoke kills some 53,000 people each year,” Moench would tell bar owners. "This is about caring for the health of your employees and customers who don't smoke," he said. Seven years later, all other bar owners in California would eventually join him. In 1994, Gov. Pete Wilson signed a law banning smoking in the workplace. A temporary exemption was carved out for bars and casinos, but that ended on January 1, 1998.

Father's Office was purchased in 2000 by owner and head chef Sang Yoon, who had cooked gourmet California cuisine at Michael's restaurant in Santa Monica, California. Yoon opened the bar's kitchen which had previously offered cheese plates and a list of local delivery options for patrons to bring in. The main attraction was the Office Burger, a patty of fine dry-aged beef topped with caramelized onions, Gruyère and Maytag cheeses, applewood-smoked bacon compote and arugula served on a soft roll. 

Sang Yoon is infamous for allowing no substitutions or alterations of any type to the food served at Father's Office, including no ketchup.

A second Father's Office location in the Helms Bakery building in Los Angeles, California was opened in April 2008.

References

External links

Gastropubs in California
Restaurants in Greater Los Angeles
Companies based in Santa Monica, California
Restaurants established in 1955
1955 establishments in California